Jinnahpur refers to a plot in Pakistan to form a breakaway autonomous state to serve as a homeland for the Muhajir people.

Overview
Mohajirs were refugees who moved to modern-day Pakistan from modern-day India during Partition of India in 1947. The name to be given to the proposed breakaway state was "Jinnahpur", named after Mohammed Ali Jinnah. In 1992, the Pakistani military had found maps of the proposed Jinnahpur state in the offices of the Mohajir Qaumi Movement (now renamed Muttahida Qaumi Movement). The government of Nawaz Sharif chose to use it as the basis for the military operation against the MQM, known as Operation Clean-up.

Critics 
In August 2009, two senior military officers at the time (one of them Brigadier Imtiaz Billa) of the operation claimed that the maps had been fabricated. 
According to them the Jinnahpur maps were false allegations and an attempt to divide the nation. Their stance was immediately challenged by Major (R) Nadeem Dar, then an ISI officer, who claimed to have recovered maps and related documents personally after raiding MQM headquarter and sent them to Major Haroon and Major Nadeem

Muhajir Sooba

The Muhajir Sooba (literally meaning 'Immigrant Province') is a political movement which seeks to represent the Muhajir people of Sindh. This concept floated as a political bargaining tool by the leader of Muttahida Qaumi Movement, Altaf Hussain for the creation of a Muhajir province for the Muhajir-majority areas of Sindh, which would be independent from Sindh government.

Sindh-I and Sindh-II 
The political deprivations of MQM became the major causes leading towards the demand of a separate province. Mahajir people are held back not giving government jobs or any part on policy making. Most of the mahajir areas are ignored for any development, infrastructure.Transport.Health.Education.Sports.Drinking Water & Basic Utilities  Various other names have been suggested by Altaf Hussain to refer to proposed new province such as Sindh 1 and Sindh 2.

Opposition 
The Pakistan Peoples Party, as well as Pakistan Tehreek-e-Insaf leader Imran Khan and other major political parties of Pakistan, opposed the creation of a separate province.

References

, Dawn.com, 26 August 2009
Migrants and militants: fun and urban violence in Pakistan,  Oskar Verkaaik, 2004, pp78
Inside Pakistan: 52 years outlook, Sanjay Dutt, 2000, pp260,

History of Karachi
Proposed provinces and territories of Pakistan
Conspiracy theories in Pakistan
Muttahida Qaumi Movement